Julius Frey (25 October 1881 in Stuttgart – 28 August 1960 in Stuttgart) was a German swimmer who competed in the Swimming at the 1900 Summer Olympics. He was a member of the German swimming team, which won the gold medal at the Paris event. He also competed in the 200 metre freestyle event and finished eighth.

References

External links
 
 profile

1881 births
1960 deaths
Sportspeople from Stuttgart
German male swimmers
Olympic swimmers of Germany
Swimmers at the 1900 Summer Olympics
Olympic gold medalists for Germany
Medalists at the 1900 Summer Olympics
Olympic gold medalists in swimming
German male freestyle swimmers